The 2022 FA Vase Final was the 48th final of the Football Association's cup competition for teams at levels 9–11 of the English football league system. The match was contested between Littlehampton Town of the Southern Combination Premier Division and Newport Pagnell Town of the United Counties League Premier Division South.

Route to the Final

Littlehampton Town

Newport Pagnell Town

Match

Details

References

FA Vase Finals
FA Vase Final
Events at Wembley Stadium
FA Vase Final